Leandro Sales de Santana, better known as Leozinho (born 12 December 1985 in São Luís), is a Brazilian footballer who plays as midfielder.

Career
An attacking midfielder in a creative role, who can also play wider, Leozinho started his professional career with Brazilian club Vasco da Gama but failed to make an impact. He continued his career by returning to his youth club Sport Recife. After joining Treze, interest in him also came from Europe. In 2007, he joined Greek champions Olympiacos, though failing to make an appearance for the team, and was mostly sent away on loan. Since then he has played for seven different clubs, including German side Braunschweig, Greek clubs OFI, Apollon Pontou, Panserraikos, Kalloni, Iraklis, and Turkish side Denizlispor.

On 27 May 2017, Leozinho signed a two-year contract with AEL. On 26 November 2017 he scored his first goal in a 3-1 away loss against Panetolikos. On 21 December 2017 he sealed a 3-0 home win against Xanthi for the first leg of the round of 16 of the Greek Cup.

References

External links

1985 births
Living people
Brazilian footballers
Brazil under-20 international footballers
Brazilian expatriate footballers
Treze Futebol Clube players
Sport Club do Recife players
Panserraikos F.C. players
AEL Kalloni F.C. players
Athlitiki Enosi Larissa F.C. players
Apollon Pontou FC players
OFI Crete F.C. players
CR Vasco da Gama players
Eintracht Braunschweig players
Denizlispor footballers
Iraklis Thessaloniki F.C. players
2. Bundesliga players
Super League Greece players
TFF First League players
Expatriate footballers in Germany
Expatriate footballers in Greece
Expatriate footballers in Turkey
Association football midfielders
People from São Luís, Maranhão
Sportspeople from Maranhão